Carlos Aguirre (born 10 October 1938) is a retired Mexican volleyball player. He was part of the Mexican teams that finished tenth at the 1968 Summer Olympics.

References

1938 births
Living people
Olympic volleyball players of Mexico
Volleyball players at the 1968 Summer Olympics